Denis Olegovich Sobolev (born 13 August 1993) is a Russian professional footballer who plays as a midfielder for FC Dynamo Bryansk.

Club career
Sobolev made his Russian Football National League debut for FC Mordovia Saransk on 25 September 2010 in a game against FC Rotor Volgograd.

Personal life
His identical twin brother Anton Sobolev is also a footballer.

External links 
 
 

1993 births
People from Saransk
Sportspeople from Mordovia
Living people
Russian footballers
Russia youth international footballers
Association football midfielders
Russian twins
Twin sportspeople
FC Mordovia Saransk players
FC KAMAZ Naberezhnye Chelny players
FC Neftekhimik Nizhnekamsk players
FC Zenit-Izhevsk players
FC Dynamo Bryansk players
Russian First League players
Russian Second League players